K8 or K-8 may refer to:

 K-8 (Kansas highway), two highways in Kansas, one in northern Kansas, one in southern Kansas
 K-8 school, a type of school that includes kindergarten and grades one through eight
 K8 telephone box, designed by Bruce Martin
 AMD K8, the internal designation for the first generation of AMD64-architecture microprocessors from AMD
 Hongdu JL-8 or K-8, a training aircraft
 Kaliningrad K-8 (AA-3 Anab), a Soviet missile
 Norrlands dragonregemente or K 8, a Swedish Army cavalry regiment
 Schleicher Ka 8, a single-seat glider
 Soviet submarine K-8
 Violin Sonata No. 3 (Mozart) K. 8, by Wolfgang Amadeus Mozart 
 Zambia Skyways, IATA airline designator
 World Atlantic Airlines, IATA airline designator
 Kan Air, IATA airline designator
 K8, a member of the Mazda K engine family
 LG K8, an LG K series mobile phone released in 2016
 K8 group, an online casino company
 Kubernetes, a software container orchestration system

See also
8K (disambiguation)